Atlas Solutions is a subsidiary of Meta Platforms, acquired from Microsoft in February, 2013, which provides services in online advertising.  The Atlas advertising platform, originally built by Razorfish, serves billions of ad impressions a day and features a suite of tools for marketers to serve, manage, track, and measure the performance of advertisement campaigns.

Atlas was shut down in March 2018.

See also
DART (DoubleClick)
AppNexus

References

External links 
 

Meta Platforms acquisitions
Contextual advertising
2013 mergers and acquisitions